Alison Wyeth (born 26 May 1964) is a female English former middle and long-distance runner.

Athletics career
Wyeth represented Great Britain at the Olympic Games in 1992 and 1996, as well as at three World Championships, finishing 5th in the 3000 metres final at the 1993 World Championships. She won AAAs Championship titles at 1500m (1993), 3000m (1989) and 5000m (1995), and twice won the UK Athletics Championships title at 1500 m (1990–91). She represented England in the 3,000 metres event, at the 1990 Commonwealth Games in Auckland, New Zealand. Four years later she represented England and won a bronze medal in the 3,000 metres event, at the 1994 Commonwealth Games in Victoria, British Columbia, Canada.

Wyeth started coaching in 2001.

Personal life
Wyeth was born in Southampton, England. She was once married to a fellow British runner, John Nuttall, but has since divorced. They have two children, Hannah Nuttall and Luke Nuttall, both of whom are runners as well.

Competition record

Personal bests
Outdoor
1500 metres – 4:03.17 (Monaco 1993)
One mile – 4:24.87 (Oslo 1991)
3000 metres – 8:38.42 (Stuttgart 1993)
5000 metres – 15:00.37 (London 1995)
Half marathon – 1:10:54 (The Hague 1998)
Marathon – 2:38:26 (Edinburgh 1999)

Indoor
3000 metres – 9:03.59 (Birmingham 1993)

References

1964 births
Living people
Sportspeople from Southampton
British female long-distance runners
English female long-distance runners
British female marathon runners
English female marathon runners
British female cross country runners
English female cross country runners
Olympic athletes of Great Britain
Athletes (track and field) at the 1992 Summer Olympics
Athletes (track and field) at the 1996 Summer Olympics
Commonwealth Games medallists in athletics
Athletes (track and field) at the 1994 Commonwealth Games
World Athletics Championships athletes for Great Britain
Commonwealth Games bronze medallists for England
Medallists at the 1994 Commonwealth Games